Louisiana's 15th House district is one of 105 Louisiana House of Representatives districts. It is currently represented by Republican Foy Gadberry of West Monroe.

Geography 
HD15 includes the cities of Calhoun, Claiborne, and parts of Bawcomville, Brownsville, and West Monroe.

Election results

References 

Louisiana House of Representatives districts
Louisiana State Legislature